Return of the One-Armed Swordsman, also known as One-Armed Swordsman Return, is a 1969 Hong Kong wuxia film directed by Chang Cheh and produced by the Shaw Brothers Studio. The film is a sequel to the 1967 film One-Armed Swordsman, with Jimmy Wang and Lisa Chiao Chiao reprising their roles.

A sequel was released in 1971 entitled The New One-Armed Swordsman.

Plot
The eponymous character, played by Jimmy Wang, has hung up his signature broken sword and is living peacefully with his wife. Meanwhile, a band of tyrannical sword masters called the Eight Sword Kings are challenging the masters of all rival schools in an effort to take over the martial arts community.  Any that refuse are murdered by the Eight Kings' twin enforcers, the Black and White Knights. After capturing all the rival masters, the Eight Kings deliver an ultimatum; all the rival schools' students must cut off their sword arms and surrender the severed limbs to the Eight Kings, or the students' beloved teachers will all die. The students turn to the legendary One-Armed Swordsman, who is at first reluctant, especially when one student kidnaps his wife to force him to help, but is convinced when a student actually does sacrificially chop his own arm off in despair. The One-Armed Swordsman must then contend with the unique styles and weapons of the Eight Kings:

  Winged Blade (or Flying Dragon in another translation dub) uses his speed and leaping prowess to attack from the air.  One-Arm bests him and his students with a variety of ground-based traps.
  Hooking Blade wields a chained sickle.  One-Arm defeats him by hanging him by his own weapon from a tree, allowing One-Arm to eviscerate him.
  Buried Blade hides in pits before leaping out to ambush his opponents.  One-Arm bests him by chopping down bamboo to pin down his students and then standing atop the trunks, keeping him out of reach of Buried Blade's attacks to stab him with a bamboo spear.
  Whirling Blade wields a pair of bladed bucklers which can also be thrown as projectiles.  One-Arm catches the blades on his sword and flings them back at their owner.
  Mighty Blade uses his immense strength and giant two handed sword to overpower his opponents.  After luring him outside the Kings' fort, the students drop a net over him to restrain him as they mutilate him.
  Thunder Blade wields smokebombs and a sword whose blade conceals a smoke sprayer and a shotgun.  After using water to douse the smoke, One-Arm uses a cloth shield to block the pellets before cutting him down.
  Thousand Blade (or One Thousand Fingers) the only female King uses her sexuality to lull her targets into lowering their guard before killing them with the many knives concealed in the sleeves of her robe.  After failing to seduce One-Arm, she is fatally stabbed by one of the students she seduced and wounded.
  Unseen Blade (the Unseen) the leader of the Eight Kings uses deception and distraction to confuse his opponents along with a collapsible sword whose blade can extend during battle and also has a hidden hook.  One-Arm uses his skill in close range combat and left handed sword fighting to get inside Unseen's range and slice off his sword arm.

In the end the One-Armed Swordsman defeats the Eight Kings and their armies, but by that time all of the sword fighting students who were helping him are dead. He leaves the last King, Unseen, to be killed by their vengeful masters as he and his wife return home.

Cast
Jimmy Wang as Fang Gang, the One-Armed Swordsman
Lisa Chiao Chiao as Xiao Man
Essie Lin Chia as Hua Niangzi (Thousand Hands King)
Chung Wa as Lu Da
Cheng Lui as Lu Tong
Hoh Ban as Lu Long
Tien Feng as Furtive King Ling Xu
Ku Feng as Hercules King Jiao Feng
Tung Li as Poisonous Dragon King Duan Shu
Tong Gai as Spinning Wheels King Song Wen
Lau Kar-wing as Hell's Buddha King Shi Fu
Lau Kar-leung as Ape's Arms King Yuan Qian
Yuen Cheung-yan as Flying Fighter King Deng Fei
Ti Lung as Lu Hong
Wang Kuang-yu as Lu Chun
Wu Ma as White Swordsman Guan Shun
Fong Yau as Black Swordsman Guan Heng
Cliff Lok as Mu Jun
Chan Sing as Shan Xiong
Lee Ho as Xu Long
Fong Yue as Ding Sheng
Yau Ming as Lu Chong / Lei
Lau Gong as Yan Yun
Yau Lung as Mu Jun
Lui Ban as Lu Yuan
Nam Wai-lit as King's gate guard
Tong Tin-hei as chief
Chin Chun as chief killed by Furtive King
Yee Kwan as chief
Wong Ching-ho as Uncle Mu
Hao Li-jen as village representative
Luk Chuen as victim of poisonous dragon
Cheung Hei as inn servant
David Chiang as Yin
Tang Tak-cheung
Wong Pau-gei
Chan Chuen
Yen Shi-kwan
Wong Mei
Yuen Woo-ping
Lo Wai
Wong Chung
Chui Chung-hok
Tam Bo
Ng Yuen-fan
Ho Bo-sing
Lee Siu-wa
Yeung Jan-sing
Fan Dan
Fung Hap-so
Chan Seng-tong
Yuen Shing-chau
Chan Keung
Hsu Hsia

External links

Films directed by Chang Cheh
Shaw Brothers Studio films
Wuxia films
1969 films
1960s action films
Hong Kong martial arts films
1960s Mandarin-language films
Hong Kong sequel films